Robert Eddie "Bob" Brown (February 23, 1939December 10, 1998) was a National Football League defensive end who played for the Green Bay Packers, the San Diego Chargers and the Cincinnati Bengals in an eleven-year career that lasted from 1966 to 1976.

External links
NFL.com player page

References

1939 births
1998 deaths
People from Morehouse Parish, Louisiana
Players of American football from Louisiana
American football defensive ends
American football defensive tackles
Arkansas–Pine Bluff Golden Lions football players
Green Bay Packers players
San Diego Chargers players
Cincinnati Bengals players
National Conference Pro Bowl players